Nikolay Sviridov (born 6 June 1938) is a Soviet long-distance runner. He competed in the 5000 metres at the 1968 Summer Olympics and the 1972 Summer Olympics.

References

1938 births
Living people
Athletes (track and field) at the 1968 Summer Olympics
Athletes (track and field) at the 1972 Summer Olympics
Soviet male long-distance runners
Olympic athletes of the Soviet Union
Place of birth missing (living people)